Mexicans Without Borders is a Washington, D.C.-based rights group that has been active against what it sees as the growing harassment of alien workers.  The group also seeks to address the broader social and political roots of immigration.

The central objectives of MSF are permanent residency for all illegal aliens residing in the country and the establishment of legal channels for future waves of aliens.

The committees of undocumented folks that now form the organization first came together in 2001.  Its organizers claim that giving permanent residency to the 11 million workers and families in the country illegally would greatly benefit all workers.  They have stated that they support all reforms that benefit aliens, but are looking for a more thorough reform that provides solutions to the phenomenon of immigration at a structural level, not just at the level of legality.

The group has organized mass demonstrations in the Virginia and Washington D.C. areas to protest local laws that they claimed targeting aliens.  They also document and record cases of alleged discrimination and racial profiling in order to build civil lawsuits in federal courts.

References
 S&L Magazine, May 2005, interview with    Macrina Cárdenas
 MRZine, Mar. 9, 2008, article by Nancy Lyall
 AP article "No. Va. county sees signs of change amid crackdown" via Google News, retrieved May 28, 2008

Ethnic organizations based in the United States
Protests in the United States
Immigration political advocacy groups in the United States